Crescent Heights High School is a public high school with approximately 1,300 students in grades 7–12 in Medicine Hat, Alberta. The school is part of the Medicine Hat School District No. 76 and is one of four high schools in the city of Medicine Hat, Alberta supporting a population of some 60,000 people. There are approximately 210 students per grade. The junior high school students are grouped in homeroom classes while the senior high school students are in classes independent of each other.

Sports and extracurricular programs 
CHHS offers extracurricular programs and sports activities for students to participate in including:

Athletics
Badminton
Basketball
Cross country running
Football
Volleyball
Rugby
Track and Field
Ringette Academy 
Table Tennis

Extracurriculars
Anime
Jr and Sr Council
Chess
Religion Based Groups
Robotics Club
Grad Choir
Jazz Band
Myplace activities for grade sevens and eights
E-Sports Club

Fine Arts
CHHS is also known for its remarkable arts programs that include the drama, band, and visual art programs.

Theatre Arts

CHHS Drama, under the direction of Jennifer Davies, has mainly made renditions of plays and musicals. Their plays are often known for their live musicians in the pit orchestra. Many CHHS graduates of the Drama program have gone on to pursue the Fine Arts professionally.

CHHS Drama has presented many Broadway featured shows including: "Happy Days: The Musical," "Addams Family," "All Shook Up," "The Lion King Jr.," "Bonnie & Clyde," "Young Frankenstein," "Newsies," and "Bullets Over Broadway." In January 2020 they presented the musical "We Will Rock You."

Senior Band

The CHHS Senior Band, directed by Curtis Perrin, has toured around the world and is best known for success at the Harrogate International Music Festival.  They have been requested as repeat performers at St. James Church, Birstwith, UK for the past 6 years. Many graduates of the Band program have gone on to pursue music professionally, achieving outstanding success.

Notable alumni

Terri Clark - Country music star
Gordie Johnson - Musician, current frontman of Grady, former frontman of Big Sugar
Aaron Crawford - CFL Football Player
Mark Sakamoto - Writer

References

External links

CHHS About Us
CHHS Sports and Community events on video

High schools in Alberta
Medicine Hat
Educational institutions in Canada with year of establishment missing